Kalambatritra Special Reserve is a wildlife reserve in southern Madagascar. It is to the north of Andohahela National Park, south-west of the Manombo Special Reserve and contains many endemic species, including forty-five endemic bird species.

Geography
The Kalambatritra massif is a series of undulating hills and steep summits and is part of the Antaivondro-Kalambatritra mountain chain. The many small streams feed the Ionaivo, Mananara and Mandrare rivers.

The dominant ethnic group in the area is the Bara people.

Flora and fauna
The humid, evergreen forest is relatively undisturbed and divided into blocks with savannahs of the coarse grass (Aristida imperata) inbetween. Among the 699 species of plants so far recorded on the reserve, two families are endemic; the Torricelliaceae, including Melanophylla alnifolia and the Sarcolaenaceae including Leptolaena pauciflora, which, according to the International Union for Conservation of Nature (IUCN) is an endangered species on the IUCN Red List.

Seventy-four species of birds are known from the reserve, of which forty-five are endemic. They are all listed as of least concern except Meller's duck (Anas melleri), which is listed as endangered and the wedge-tailed jery (Neomixis flavoviridis), Madagascar yellowbrow (Crossleyia xanthophrys), Grey-crowned Tetraka (Bernieria cinereiceps),  Pollen's Vanga (Xenopirostris polleni) and Rufous-headed ground roller (Atelornis crossleyi) which are all listed as near threatened.

Lemurs found on the reserve are listed below.

Threats
Growing rice and cutting wood for construction and cooking are the main threats to the area.

See also
 List of national parks of Madagascar

References

External links
 Kalambatritra Special Reserve

ex

1959 establishments in Madagascar
Anosy
Special reserves of Madagascar
Protected areas established in 1959
Madagascar subhumid forests
Important Bird Areas of Madagascar